Cooleys Corner is an unincorporated community located within Upper Freehold Township in Monmouth County, New Jersey, United States. The site of the settlement is within the Assunpink Wildlife Management Area, a New Jersey Department of Environmental Protection Division of Fish and Wildlife-operated preserved area in Monmouth and Mercer counties along the Assunpink Creek. Before the creation of the Assunpink Lake in the 1970s, the area consisted of farmland located at the intersection of Clarksburg Road and Imlaystown-Hightstown Road. Some farmland is still present in the area but is now mostly used by hunters. The main boat ramp to Assunpink Lake is located along the former Imlaystown-Hightstown Road.

References

Upper Freehold Township, New Jersey
Unincorporated communities in Monmouth County, New Jersey
Unincorporated communities in New Jersey